Dichomeris collina is a moth in the family Gelechiidae. It was described by Edward Meyrick in 1914. It is found in Peru.

The forewings are fuscous with a small spot of dark fuscous suffusion on the base of the costa. The stigmata are very small, obscure, dark fuscous, with the plical rather obliquely beyond the first discal. The hindwings are dark fuscous, becoming subhyaline (almost glass like) towards the costa.

References

Moths described in 1914
collina